Spermophorides is a genus of cellar spiders that was first described by J. Wunderlich in 1992.

Species
 it contains thirty-four species, found in Africa, Portugal, France, Italy, and Spain:
Spermophorides africana Huber, 2007 – Tanzania
Spermophorides anophthalma Wunderlich, 1999 – Canary Is.
Spermophorides baunei Wunderlich, 1995 – Sardinia
Spermophorides caesaris (Wunderlich, 1987) – Canary Is.
Spermophorides cuneata (Wunderlich, 1987) – Canary Is.
Spermophorides elevata (Simon, 1873) – Western Mediterranean
Spermophorides esperanza (Wunderlich, 1987) – Canary Is.
Spermophorides flava Wunderlich, 1992 – Canary Is.
Spermophorides fuertecavensis Wunderlich, 1992 – Canary Is.
Spermophorides fuerteventurensis (Wunderlich, 1987) – Canary Is.
Spermophorides gibbifera (Wunderlich, 1987) – Canary Is.
Spermophorides gomerensis (Wunderlich, 1987) – Canary Is.
Spermophorides hermiguensis (Wunderlich, 1987) – Canary Is.
Spermophorides heterogibbifera (Wunderlich, 1987) (type) – Canary Is.
Spermophorides hierroensis Wunderlich, 1992 – Canary Is.
Spermophorides huberti (Senglet, 1973) – Spain, France
Spermophorides icodensis Wunderlich, 1992 – Canary Is.
Spermophorides lanzarotensis Wunderlich, 1992 – Canary Is.
Spermophorides lascars Saaristo, 2001 – Seychelles
Spermophorides mamma (Wunderlich, 1987) – Canary Is.
Spermophorides mammata (Senglet, 1973) – Spain
Spermophorides mediterranea (Senglet, 1973) – Spain, France
Spermophorides mercedes (Wunderlich, 1987) – Canary Is.
Spermophorides petraea (Senglet, 1973) – Spain
Spermophorides pseudomamma (Wunderlich, 1987) – Canary Is.
Spermophorides ramblae Wunderlich, 1992 – Canary Is.
Spermophorides reventoni Wunderlich, 1992 – Canary Is.
Spermophorides sciakyi (Pesarini, 1984) – Canary Is.
Spermophorides selvagensis Wunderlich, 1992 – Selvagens Is.
Spermophorides simoni (Senglet, 1973) – France (Corsica)
Spermophorides tenerifensis (Wunderlich, 1987) – Canary Is.
Spermophorides tenoensis Wunderlich, 1992 – Canary Is.
Spermophorides tilos (Wunderlich, 1987) – Canary Is.
Spermophorides valentiana (Senglet, 1973) – Spain

See also
 List of Pholcidae species

References

Araneomorphae genera
Pholcidae
Spiders of Africa
Spiders of the Canary Islands